Amorosa may refer to:

 Amorosa (1986 film), a 1986 Swedish film
 Amorosa (2012 film), a 2012 Filipino psychological horror drama film